Karolina  (German Karlshof) is a village in the administrative district of Gmina Baranów, within Grodzisk Mazowiecki County, Masovian Voivodeship, in east-central Poland.

References

Karolina